Sporting Club JuveCaserta (sometimes spelled Juve Caserta), also known as Decò Caserta after its title sponsor, is an Italian professional basketball team based in Caserta, Campania. The team currently plays in the Serie A2, the second tier of Italian basketball.

For past club sponsorship names, see sponsorship names.

History
JuveCaserta was founded by a group of local enthusiasts in 1951. The name Sporting Club Juventus was chosen by Santino Piccolo, a fan of the homonymous Turin football team. The team started playing on the clay courts of the Liceo Classico Pietro Giannone.

The side played in the 1985–86 and 1986–87 finals of the first division Serie A before finally winning the competition in 1990–91, the first team from the south of Italy to do so. They had earlier won the Italian Cup in 1988 and reached the European Cup Winners' Cup final in 1989.

Following the 1997–98 season, the club went bankrupt. In 2004, two lower-level Caserta-based teams merged under the name of JuveCaserta. That side returned to the Serie A in 2008 after winning the LegaDue promotion playoffs.

Finishing in second-place in the league during the 2009–10 season, Caserta reached the playoff semi-finals but lost the series against Armani Jeans Milano 2-3.
The next season saw the side lose in the EuroLeague first qualifying round to Russian team Khimki, playing instead in the Eurocup where they reached the quarterfinals where they narrowly lost to UNICS.

In July 2017, Juvecaserta Basket was excluded by CONI from the 2017–18 LBA season, due to financial issues. Vanoli Cremona was reprieved and took the place of Juvecaserta. In the 2017–18 season, the team would play in the Serie D, the fifth tier.

Honours and titles

Domestic competitions
Italian League
 Winners (1): 1990–91
 Runners-up (2): 1985–86, 1986–87
Italian Cup
 Winners (1): 1987–88
 Runners-up (2): 1983–84, 1988–89

European competitions
FIBA Saporta Cup
 Runners-up (1): 1988–89
FIBA Korać Cup
 Runners-up (1): 1985–86
 Semifinalist (1): 1986–87
European Super Cup
 3rd place (1): 1984

Retired numbers

Notable players

Head coaches
  Bogdan Tanjević 4 seasons: '82–'86
  Ranko Žeravica 1 season: '93–'94
  Andrea Trinchieri 1 season: '07–'08

Sponsorship names
Throughout the years, due to sponsorship, the club has been known as :

Juventus Caserta (no sponsorship, 1975–76 until 1978–79)
Il Diario Caserta (1979–80)
Latte Matese Caserta (1980–81 until 1981–82)
Indesit Caserta (1982–83 until 1984–85)
Mobilgirgi Caserta (1985–86 until 1986–87)
Snaidero Caserta (1987–88 until 1988–89)
Phonola Caserta (1989–90 until 1992–93)
Onyx Caserta (1993–94)
Pepsi Caserta (2000–01)
Centro Energia Caserta (2001)
Ellebielle Caserta (2001–02)
Centro Energia Caserta (2002–03)
Pepsi Caserta (2003–04 until 2007–08)
Eldo Caserta (2008–09)
Pepsi Caserta (2009–10 until 2010–11)
Otto Caserta (2011–12)
JuveCaserta (no sponsorship, 2012–13)
Pasta Reggia Caserta (2013–14 until 2016–17)

References

External links 
Official website 
Serie A team profile  Retrieved 23 August 2015
Eurobasket.com profile

1951 establishments in Italy
Basketball teams established in 1951
Basketball teams in Campania
Caserta